is a Japanese manga series written by Shinji Makari and illustrated by Double-S. It has been serialized in Kodansha's Monthly Afternoon since January 2017.

Publication
Issak is written by Shinji Makari and illustrated by Double-S. The series began in Kodansha's Monthly Afternoon on January 25, 2017. Kodansha has collected its chapters into individual tankōbon volumes. The first volume was released on July 21, 2017. As of July 22, 2022, thirteen volumes have been released.

The manga is licensed in France by Ki-oon and in Spain by Norma Editorial.

Volume list

Reception
Issak was one of the Jury Recommended Works at the 21st Japan Media Arts Festival in 2018. It won the Saito Takao Award 2019, established by manga artist Takao Saito and the Saito Takao Gekiga Cultural Foundation.

See also
Yugo, another manga series written by Shinji Makari

References

External links
 

Action anime and manga
Historical anime and manga
Kodansha manga
Seinen manga